The Rhythm and Blues Foundation is an independent American nonprofit organization dedicated to the historical and cultural preservation of rhythm and blues music.

The idea for the foundation came in 1987 during discussions about royalties with entertainer Ruth Brown, entertainment attorney Howell Begle, and Ahmet Ertegun, the head of Atlantic Records. Ertegun provided a $1.5 million donation, and the foundation was officially established in 1988 in Washington, D.C. and in 2005 moved its offices to Philadelphia, P.A. The foundation provides financial support, medical assistance and educational outreach through various grants and programs to support R&B and Motown artists from the 1940s through the 1970s.

The Rhythm and Blues Foundation has also produced their Annual event the Pioneer Awards since the 1980s, then under the Direction of Suzan Jenkins, Executive Director. It also administered the Doc Pomus Financial Assistance Program, The Motown/Universal Music Group Fund, and the Gwendolyn B. Gordy Fuqua Fund providing emergency assistance to legendary aging artists.

Pioneer Award honorees 

2008
Al Bell (Leadership Award)
Sugar Pie DeSanto
Donny Hathaway (Legacy Tribute Award)
The Funk Brothers (Sidemen Award)
Chaka Khan (Lifetime Achievement Award)
Kool & The Gang
Teena Marie
The Whispers
Bill Withers

2006
Thom Bell (Entrepreneur Award)
Frankie Beverly
Chubby Checker
The Delfonics
Berry Gordy (Lifetime Achievement Award)
Bettye LaVette
Barbara Mason
Otis Redding (Legacy Tribute Award)

2003
George Clinton
The Del Vikings
The Dixie Cups
The Supremes
Clarence "Frogman" Henry
Hal Jackson
Johnny Nash
Maceo Parker
Koko Taylor
Dionne Warwick (Lifetime Achievement Award)
Jackie Wilson (Legacy Tribute Award)

2001
Allen Toussaint
Big Jay McNeely
Dee Dee Sharp
The Emotions
Fontella Bass
Reverend Al Green (Lifetime Achievement Award)
Holland-Dozier-Holland
Louis Jordan (Legacy Tribute Award)
Sly & the Family Stone

2000
The Chi-Lites
Ahmet Ertegun
Marvin Gaye (Legacy Tribute Award)
The Impressions
Johnnie Johnson
Clyde Otis
Sylvia Robinson
Huey "Piano" Smith
Stevie Wonder (Lifetime Achievement Award)
Betty Wright

1999
Johnny Adams
Ashford & Simpson
Mickey Baker
Sam Cooke (Legacy Tribute Award)
Isaac Hayes & David Porter
Brenda Holloway
John Lee Hooker (Lifetime Achievement Award)
Patti LaBelle & The Bluebells with original 4th member, Cindy Birdsong
Barbara Lewis
Barbara Lynn
The Manhattans
Garnet Mimms
Johnny Moore
Bill Pinkney
Joe Simon
Charlie Thomas
Dee Dee Warwick

1998
Herb Abramson
Faye Adams
Bobby Byrd
Tyrone Davis
The Five Satins
The Harptones
Screamin' Jay Hawkins
Ernie K-Doe
Gladys Knight & the Pips (Lifetime Achievement Award)
The O'Jays
David "Fathead" Newman
Kim Weston

1997
William Bell
Gary U.S. Bonds
Clarence "Gatemouth" Brown
Gene Chandler
The Four Tops (Lifetime Achievement Award)
Little Milton
Gloria Lynne
The Miracles
Ruby & The Romantics
The Spinners
Phil Upchurch
Van "Piano Man" Walls

1996
Dave Bartholomew
The Cadillacs
The Chantels
Bo Diddley (Lifetime Achievement Award)
Betty Everett
The Flamingos
Eddie Floyd
The Isley Brothers
Jay McShann
Johnnie Taylor
Doris Troy
Johnny "Guitar" Watson
Bobby Womack

1995
Booker T. & the M.G.'s
Fats Domino (Lifetime Achievement Award)
Inez and Charlie Foxx
Cissy Houston
Illinois Jacquet
Darlene Love
The Marvelettes
The Moonglows
Lloyd Price
Arthur Prysock
Mabel Scott
Junior Walker
Justine "Baby" Washington

1994
Otis Blackwell
Jerry Butler
The Coasters/The Robins
Clarence Carter
Don Covay
Bill Doggett
Mable John
Ben E. King
Little Richard (Lifetime Achievement Award)
Johnny Otis
Earl Palmer
The Shirelles
Irma Thomas

1993
Hadda Brooks
James Brown & The Famous Flames  (Lifetime Achievement Award) 
Solomon Burke
Dave Clark
Floyd Dixon
David "Panama" Francis
Lowell Fulson
Erskine Hawkins
Little Anthony & The Imperials
Wilson Pickett
Martha Reeves & The Vandellas
Carla Thomas
Jimmy Witherspoon

1992
Hank Ballard & The Midnighters
Bobby "Blue" Bland
The Dells
Aretha Franklin (Lifetime Achievement Award)
Chuck Jackson
Ella Johnson
Nellie Lutcher
The Staple Singers
Jesse Stone
Rufus Thomas
Paul "Hucklebuck" Williams

1990/91
Maxine Brown (soul singer)
Ray Charles (Lifetime Achievement Award)
The Five Keys
Al Hibbler
Albert King
Jimmy McCracklin
Curtis Mayfield
Sam Moore
Doc Pomus
The Spaniels

1989
LaVern Baker
Charles Brown
Ruth Brown
The Clovers
Etta James
"Little" Jimmy Scott
Percy Sledge
Mary Wells

References

External links 

Rhythm and Blues Foundation website

Rhythm and blues
Peabody Award winners